Cormac Ó Domhnalláin, Ollamh Síol Muireadaigh, died 1436.

The Annals of Connacht state:

1436:Cormac O Domnallain, ollav of the Sil Murray in Poetry, died.

Sources

The Encyclopaedia of Ireland 2003; .
 Mac Dermot of Moylurg: The Story of a Connacht Family Dermot Mac Dermot, 1996.
A New History of Ireland VIII: A Chronology of Irish History to 1976 - A Companion to Irish History Part I edited by T.W. Moody, F.X. Martin and F.J. Byrne, 1982. 
The Celebrated Antiquary Nollaig O Muralie, Maynooth, 1996.
Irish Leaders and Learning Through the Ages Fr. Paul Walsh, 2004. (ed. Nollaig O Muralie).

External links
List of Published Texts at CELT — University College Cork's Corpus of Electronic Texts

1436 deaths
14th-century Irish historians
People from County Galway
People from County Roscommon
15th-century Irish poets
Irish-language writers
Year of birth unknown
Irish male poets